Flemington railway station is located on the Main Suburban line, serving the Sydney suburb of Homebush West and the markets of Flemington. It is served by Sydney Trains T2 Inner West & Leppington line services.

History

Flemington station opened in 1884. On 25 May 1924, it was relocated further west to its present site when the  Main Suburban line was quadrupled from Homebush to Lidcombe.

From 1923 until 1972, extensive cattle yards existed opposite the station to the north. This was redeveloped as the Sydney Markets in 1975. It included railway sidings for produce trains. These have since been decommissioned. When Enfield Yard was closed for redevelopment in the mid-1990s, the sidings became a locomotive changeover point for freight trains. 

The suburb of Flemington, south of the station, has long been residential. The suburb of Flemington has since been renamed "Homebush West", with the "Flemington" name officially restricted to only the markets north of the station. 

An upgrade to the station was planned from 2014 and works completed in 2018, resulting in the replacement of the historic concourse with a new one with lift access to the platforms.

To the west of the station is the Flemington Maintenance Depot where the Olympic Park line branches off. Between the station and the Sydney Markets lie two tracks exclusively used by freight trains travelling between the Main North line and the Metropolitan Goods line.

Description
Flemington railway station consists of two island platforms. The northern one (platforms numbered 1 and 2) is not in regular use, and regular scheduled services only use the southern island platform (numbered 3 and 4). Stairs and lifts connect the platforms to an overhead concourse. The main village commercial centre of Homebush West (also commonly called "Flemington") is south of the station, and the concourse descends to street level here via stairs and a lift. To the north of the station is the large market complex of Sydney Markets at Flemington. The concourse is connected to the markets on the north side via a long, elevated walkway which spans across the freight line tracks and former goods sidings and continues into the market complex.

Platforms & services

Transport links
Transit Systems operates one route via Flemington station:
408: Rookwood Cemetery to Westfield Burwood

Flemington station is served by two NightRide routes:
N60 Fairfield station to Town Hall station
N61 Carlingford station to Town Hall station

References

External links

Flemington station details Transport for New South Wales

Easy Access railway stations in Sydney
Railway stations in Sydney
Railway stations in Australia opened in 1884
Railway stations in Australia opened in 1924
Municipality of Strathfield
Main Suburban railway line